= Cell mobility =

Cell mobility generally refers to motility, but may also refer to other ways of activation, such as cell differentiation and cell proliferation.
